The Red Bull Racing RB16 and RB16B are Formula One racing cars designed and constructed by Red Bull Racing to compete during the 2020 and 2021 Formula One World Championships, respectively. They were powered by Honda's RA620H (2020) and RA621H (2021) power units, being the second and third Red Bull to use the Japanese manufacturer's engines. The drivers for 2020 were Max Verstappen and Alexander Albon, both of whom were retained by the team for a fifth and second season respectively, with Sergio Pérez taking Albon's place for 2021. Albon became the team's test and reserve driver for the 2021 season. The RB16 was planned to make its competitive debut at the 2020 Australian Grand Prix, but this was delayed when the race was cancelled and the next three events in Bahrain, Vietnam and China were postponed in response to the COVID-19 pandemic. The RB16 made its debut at the 2020 Austrian Grand Prix, while the RB16B made its debut at the 2021 Bahrain Grand Prix.

Under an agreement between teams and the Fédération Internationale de l'Automobile, 2020-specification cars—including the RB16—saw their lifespan extended to compete in 2021, with Red Bull producing an updated chassis called the RB16B, which used Honda's upgraded RA621H power unit.

Design

2020 
With largely unchanged technical regulations for the 2020 season, the RB16 was based on its predecessor the RB15. The RB16 featured a narrower nose with two additional inlets at its front, as well as a redesigned barge-board area and smaller side-pod inlets. The car also featured a large 'cape' element below the nose, bodywork that was popularised by Mercedes in  but that Red Bull had not yet adopted. Parts of the rear suspension were raised, and the rear wing featured two supporting pillars compared to its predecessor's one. The team also redesigned the front multi-link suspension of the car, with team principal Christian Horner stating that the intention was to improve the performance of the car in low-speed corners.

2021 
Red Bull used its development tokens to change the shape of the gearbox casing, allowing it to rearrange the rear suspension and significantly increase rear downforce.

Honda RA621H 
Due to difficulties caused by the COVID-19 pandemic, Honda had initially decided to postpone the introduction of its all-new power unit design to the 2022 season. However, following a reassessment of the situation after its decision to leave the sport at the end of the 2021 season, it decided to bring the new design forward by a year to 2021 in a bid to try to beat Mercedes and win the championship in its final official season, although it would only have six months to complete the design before pre-season testing with a risk of significant reliability issues if it encountered problems.

The RA621H was Honda's biggest change since 2017, as it used the same basic concept between 2017 and 2020, though it did not feature a new engine layout like in 2017. Some features of the RA621H include a notably more compact camshaft layout that is placed lower, a different valve angle and shorter cylinder bore spacing compared to the previous season's RA620H. These changes altered the shape of the combustion chamber and the airflow on the camshaft and created a significantly smaller engine with a lower centre of gravity. Honda believed that the engine is even smaller than the "size zero" design it initially used with McLaren when it returned to the sport in 2015, while having significantly improved performance. Other features of the RA621H include a way to increase the power output of the internal combustion engine without decreasing the MGU-K's output, modifications to the turbine and compressor as well as new plating on the cylinder block from the company's Kumamoto motorcycle mass production facility to improve durability.

Special livery 

At the 2021 Turkish Grand Prix, the livery of the RB16B and drivers' overalls were red and white, inspired by the livery with which Honda won their first Formula One race, the 1965 Mexican Grand Prix. The colouring was originally to be used at Honda's home race, the Japanese Grand Prix, which was cancelled due to the COVID-19 pandemic.

Competition summary

2020 

Verstappen and Albon started second and fourth on the grid respectively for the season-opening Austrian Grand Prix, however both cars would go on to retire with electrical failures during the race. Despite being reasonably competitive in the hands of Verstappen who scored several podiums including a victory at the 70th Anniversary Grand Prix at Silverstone Circuit, the car was generally no match for the combination of Lewis Hamilton and the Mercedes F1 W11 as Mercedes retained the Constructors' title and Hamilton the Drivers'. Albon struggled to find good form and was outperformed by his teammate, scoring two podium finishes to Verstappen's 11 including 2 wins. The team ended the year on a high, with Verstappen scoring a dominant victory in Abu Dhabi, the first time Red Bull won at the circuit since 2013. Albon also ended the year on a high, being able to pressure Mercedes and prevent them from trying an alternate strategy, finishing fourth. Overall, the team finished second in the constructors championship, with Verstappen and Albon finishing third and seventh, respectively.

2021 

At the season-opening Bahrain Grand Prix, Verstappen finished second and Pérez fifth. During qualifying Verstappen achieved 1st and Pérez 11th. Again Verstappen outperformed his teammate throughout the season, getting 10 wins and 18 podiums, while Pérez got one win and 5 podiums. Verstappen fought for the championship with Lewis Hamilton all season long, winning it on the last lap of the Abu Dhabi Grand Prix, after a last-minute restart, caused by a crash from Nicholas Latifi. Peréz finished fourth in the championship, after being as high as third. Even with Verstappen's success in the Drivers' Championship, Red Bull still finished second in the Constructors' Championship, again behind Mercedes by 28 points.

Overall, the RB16 and RB16B competed in 39 races, winning 13 (success rate of 33.33%). The RB16B became the first non-Mercedes car to win any championship since 2013, Honda became the first Japanese and Asian engine supplier world champions of the turbo-hybrid era, and became one of two championship cars with the Mercedes-AMG F1 W12 (Red Bull won drivers, and Mercedes won constructors).

Complete Formula One results
(key)

Notes
  Driver failed to finish the race, but was classified as they had completed over 90% of the winner's race distance.
  Half points awarded as less than 75% of race distance completed.

References

External links
Red Bull Racing Official Website
Honda Racing F1 Official Website

Red Bull Formula One cars
2020 Formula One season cars
2021 Formula One season cars
Formula One championship-winning cars